Lee Metcalf National Wildlife Refuge is a  National Wildlife Refuge (NWR) along the Bitterroot River in southwestern Montana, U.S. Established in 1964 as Ravalli NWR, it was renamed in 1978 in honor of the late Senator Lee Metcalf, a native of Montana. The refuge was set aside for the protection of migratory bird species. About 235 species of birds have been documented on the refuge, with over 100 nesting there. Additionally, 37 species of mammals, and 17 species of reptiles and amphibians also have been documented.

It includes two nature trails and a paved, wheelchair-accessible trail from the parking lot to the picnic area. The viewing area is equipped with a viewing and fishing structure, outdoor restroom facilities, benches, and an information kiosk.

One of the nature trails, the Lee Metcalf Wildlife Viewing Trail, was designated as a National Recreation Trail.

References

External links

 Lee Metcalf National Wildlife Refuge

National Wildlife Refuges in Montana
Protected areas of Ravalli County, Montana
Wetlands of Montana
Landforms of Ravalli County, Montana
Protected areas established in 1964
1964 establishments in Montana